Helen Ione White is a New Zealand politician. In 2020 she became a Member of Parliament in the House of Representatives for the Labour Party.

Biography

Early life and career
White and her family originally lived in Kawerau before moving to Auckland in 1971 where the school she attended was 98% Polynesian students. She grew up in Freemans Bay, Auckland and became a barrister, specialising in employment law. She lives in Auckland and has three children.

Early in her legal career, White worked with the Engineering, Printing and Manufacturing Union for a period alongside future Labour leader Andrew Little.

Political career

In 2009 White attempted to gain the Labour nomination in the Mount Albert by-election to replace former Prime Minister Helen Clark, but lost to David Shearer. White was ranked 40 on Labour's party list.

White received some criticism after mocking her electorate opponent, the Green Party's Chlöe Swarbrick, as a celebrity candidate and describing herself as the serious candidate,  despite the fact that Swarbrick held a seat in Parliament (as a List MP) while White didn't. A Newshub poll conducted in September 2020 had White with a large lead over her main competitors 42.3 to 26.6 for National's Emma Mellow and 24.2 for Swarbrick. By October the race had tightened. White remained in the lead but dropped to 35 percent to Mellow's 30 and Swarbrick's 26. White did not win the Auckland Central seat, losing to Swarbrick by 1068 votes, but was allocated a seat in Parliament via Labour's party list.

In March 2023, the Labour Party selected White as its candidate for the Mount Albert electorate in the 2023 New Zealand general election. The electorate had been held by Labour leader and prime minister Jacinda Ardern, who left Parliament that year.

References

Living people
New Zealand Labour Party MPs
21st-century New Zealand women politicians
New Zealand list MPs
Women members of the New Zealand House of Representatives
20th-century New Zealand lawyers
New Zealand trade unionists
Unsuccessful candidates in the 2017 New Zealand general election
Year of birth missing (living people)
21st-century New Zealand lawyers